Sweden held a general election throughout September 1911, which was the first election with universal male suffrage.

Results

Regional results

Percentage share

By votes

County results
In this era, right after the dissolution of first past the post, many counties had multiple constituencies, hence the results are listed at county levels here, comparable with most latter constituencies. The sole exception is for Stockholm, where the county and the capital city had different counts in the official statistics.

All county names have had their spellings modernized from contemporary spelling in this article. There were 292 votes for others than the three main parties, a total of 0.048%.

Percentage share

By votes

References

General elections in Sweden